For information on all Mount St. Mary's University sports, see Mount St. Mary's Mountaineers

The Mount St. Mary's Mountaineers baseball team is a varsity intercollegiate athletic team of Mount St. Mary's University in Emmitsburg, Maryland, United States. The team is a member of Metro Atlantic Athletic Conference, which is part of the National Collegiate Athletic Association's Division I. Mount St. Mary's first baseball team was fielded in 1893. The team plays its home games at Straw Family Stadium in Emmitsburg, Maryland. The Mountaineers are coached by Frank Leoni.

Mountaineers in Major League Baseball
Since the Major League Baseball Draft began in 1965, Mount St. Mary's has had 4 players selected.

See also
List of NCAA Division I baseball programs

References

External links
 

Sports clubs established in 1893